Vishnū Vāman Shirwādkar (27 February 1912 – 10 March 1999), popularly known by his pen name, Kusumāgraj, was an Marathi poet, playwright, novelist and short story writer, who wrote of freedom, justice and emancipation of the deprived, 

In a career spanning five decades starting in India's pre-independence era, he wrote 16 volumes of poems, three novels, eight volumes of short stories, seven volumes of essays, 18 plays and six one-act plays. His works like the Vishakha (1942), a collection of lyrics, inspired a generation into the Indian freedom movement, and is today considered one of the masterpieces of Indian literature.  

He was the recipient of the 1974 Sahitya Akademi Award in Marathi for Natsamrat, Padma Bhushan (1991) and the Jnanapith Award in 1987;

He also served as the President  of the Akhil Bharatiya Marathi Sahitya Sammelan held at Margao in 1964.

Early life and education
Kusumagraj was born into a Deshastha Brahmin family  on 27 February 1912 in Nashik as Gajanan Ranganath Shirwadkar. He even published some of his poetry under this name in 1930s. Upon being adopted somewhat late in life in 1930s, his name was changed to Vishnu Waman Shirwadkar. He later adopted the sobriquet 'Kusumagraj'. He pursued his primary education in Pimpalgaon and high school education in the New English School of  Nashik, which is now called J.S. Rungtha High School of Nashik. He passed matriculation from Mumbai University. In 1944, he married Manorama (née : Gangubai Sonawani) ; she died in 1972).
He was associated with Rajaram College, Kolhapur. Noted critic Keshav Rangnath Shirwadkar (1926-2018) was his younger brother.

Career
While Shirwadkar was at the H. P. T. Arts College in Nashik, his poems were published in the Ratnakar  (रत्नाकर) magazine. In 1932, at the age of 20, Shirwadkar participated in a satyagraha to support the demand for allowing the entry of  the untouchables in the Kalaram Temple at Nashik.

In 1933, Shirwadkar established the Dhruv Mandal (ध्रुव मंडळ ) and started writing in a newspaper called Nava Manu (नवा मनू). In the same year, his first collection of poems, Jeevanlahari (जीवन लहरी), was published. In 1934, Shirwadkar obtained a Bachelor of Arts degree in Marathi and English languages, from the H. P. T. College in Nashik.

Shirwadkar joined Godavari Cinetone Ltd. in 1936 and wrote the screenplay for the movie Sati Sulochana (सती सुलोचना). He also acted in the movie as Lord Lakshmana. However, the film failed to be a success.

He later worked as a journalist. He wrote in periodicals such as Saptahik Prabha (साप्ताहिक प्रभा), Dainik Prabhat (दैनिक प्रभात), Saarathi (सारथी), Dhanurdari (धनुर्धारी), and Navayug (नवयुग).  1942 was a turning point in the career of Kusumagraj, as the father-figure of Marathi literature, Vishnu Sakharam Khandekar, published Kusumgraj's compilation of poetry, Vishakha (विशाखा) at his own expense, and in his preface describing Kusumagraj as a poet of humanity, wrote, "His words manifest the social discontent but retain the optimistic conviction that the old world was giving way to a new one." Its publication coincided with the Quit India Movement, and carried the message of freedom and stood against slavery, and soon its words became popular with young men and women; in time it was to become his lasting legacy to Indian literature.

After 1943, he started adapting the plays by literary giants like Oscar Wilde, Moliere, Maurice Maeterlinck and Shakespeare, especially his tragedies, and which played an important role in boosting Marathi theatre of the period. This continued into the 1970s when his masterpiece Natsamrat , styled after Shakespeare's play King Lear , was first staged in 1970, with Sriram Lagoo as the lead. In 1946, he wrote his first novel Vaishnav (वैष्णव) and his first play Doorche Dive (दूरचे दिवे). From 1946 to 1948, he also edited a weekly called Swadesh (स्वदेश).

While temperamentally he ranged from reclusive to exclusive, he had a keen social sense and championed the cause of the downtrodden without involving himself in ground level activities. In 1950, he founded the Lokahitawādi Mandal (लोकहितवादी; organisation for social good) in Nashik which is still in existence. He also edited certain academic textbooks for school students.

However, Kusumagraj's main claim to fame was as a poet and writer. In 1954, he adapted Shakespeare's Macbeth as Rajmukut (राजमुकुट), 'The Royal Crown' to Marathi. It starred Nanasaheb Phatak and Durga Khote (Lady Macbeth). He also adapted Othello in 1960. He also worked as a lyricist in Marathi cinema.

His work reflected the changing social milieu, from being the reflection of national uprising during Indian freedom struggle and in the post-independence era it got steeped into rising social-consciousness amongst Marathi writers, which marked the advent of modern Dalit literature.

Shirwadkar was also an active participant in the Samyukta Maharashtra Movement.

Awards and recognition
To honour his work in Marathi Literature, every year the birthday of Kusumagraj, 27 February, is celebrated as "Marathi Bhasha Din" (मराठी भाषा दिन) (transl. Marathi Language Day).

 1960 - President of Mumbai Marathi Granth Sangrahalay annual function
 1960 - State Govt. for Marathi Mati 'मराठी माती' (काव्यसंग्रह)
 1962 - State Govt. for Swagat 'स्वगत' (काव्यसंग्रह)
 1964 - State Govt. for Himresha 'हिमरेषा' (काव्यसंग्रह)
 1964 - President of Akhil Bharatiya Marathi Sahitya Sammelan, Margao, Goa
 1965 - Ram Ganesh Gadkari Award 1965 by All India Nātya Parishad
 1966 - State Govt. for the play Yayati ani Devyani 'ययाति आणि देवयानी'
 1967 - State Govt. for the play Vij mhanali Dhartila 'वीज म्हणाली धरतीला'
 1970 - President of Marathi Natya Sammelan, Kolhapur
 1971 - State Govt. for the play Natsamrat 'नटससम्राट'
 1974 - Sahitya Akademi Award 1974 for his writing of the play Natsamrat, an adaptation of King Lear
 1985 - Ram Ganesh Gadkari Award from Akhil Bhartiya Natya Parishad
 1986 - The honorary degree of D.Litt. by Pune University
 1987 - Jnanpith Award  — a prestigious literary award in India, in recognition of his literary achievements
 1988 - Sangeet Nātya Lekhan Award
 1989 - President — Jagtik Marathi Parishad, Mumbai
 1991 - Padmabhushan award in the field of Literature & Education by the then President of India - R. Venkataraman.
 1996 - A star named as "Kusumagraj" in the galaxy

Death
He died on 10 March 1999 in Nashik, where his home also served as the office of the Kusumāgraj Pratishthān.

Writings
Collections of poems
 Vishakha (1942)
 Himaresha (1964)
 Chhandomayi (1982)
 Jeewanalahari (1933)
 Jaicha Kunja (1936)
 Samidha (1947)
 Kana (1952)

 Marathi Mati (1960)
 Wadalwel (1969)
 Rasyatra (1969)
 Muktayan (1985)
 Shrawan (1985)
 Prawasi Pakshi (1989)
 Patheya (1989)
 Meghdoot (1956 Marathi translation of Kalidas' Meghdoot, which is in Sanskrit)
 Swagat (1962)
 Balbodh Mevyatil Kusumagraj (1989)

Edited collections of poems
 Kāwyawāhini
 Sāhityasuwarna
 Pimpalapān
 Chandanawel
 Rasyātrā, poems chosen by Shankar Vaidya and Poet Borkar, and with a long scholarly introduction by Vaidya

Collections of stories
 Phulawāli
 Chhote Āni Mothe
 Satāriche Bol Āni Iter Kathā
 Kāhi Wruddha, Kāhi Tarun
 Prem Āni Mānjar
 Appointment
 Āhe Āni Nāhi
 Wirāmachinhe
 Pratisād
 Ekāki Tārā
 Wātewaralyā Sāwalyā
 Shakespearechyā Shodhāt
 Roopareshā
 Kusumāgrajānchyā Bārā Kathā
 Jādoochi Hodi (for children)

Plays
 Yayāti Āni Dewayāni
 Weeja Mhanāli Dharateelā
 Natsamrāt
 Doorche Diwe
 Dusarā Peshwā
 Waijayanti
 Kounteya
 Rājmukut
 Āmche Nāw Bāburāo
 Widushak
 Ek Hoti Wāghin
 Ānand
 Mukhyamantri
 Chandra Jithe Ugawat Nāhi
 Mahant
 Kaikeyi
 Becket (translation of The Honour of God by Jean Anouilh)

One-act plays
 Diwāni Dāwā
 Dewāche Ghar
 Prakāshi Dāre
 Sangharsh
 Bet
 Natak Basat Āhe Āni Itar Ekānkikā

Novels
 Waishnawa
 Jānhawi
 Kalpanechyā Teerāwar

Works in translation
 The Saint in  the Cellar: selected poems. Tr. by S. A. Virkar. New Native Press, 2003. .

Visualisation of works of Kusumagraj

The translation of Meghadūta by Kusumagraj was visualised by watercolour artist Nana Joshi. These visualisations were published in the Menaka Diwali issue in 1979.
Natsamrat, a play written by V.V. Shirwadkar for which he won several accolades, was also adapted on screen by director Mahesh Manjrekar with veteran actor Nana Patekar as Natsamrat (2016), after successful runs of the play's theatre adaptations.

See also
Marathi Language Day
List of Indian writers

References

External links
 Marathi website

Recipients of the Jnanpith Award
Recipients of the Sahitya Akademi Award in Marathi
Marathi-language writers
Marathi-language poets
People from Nashik
1912 births
1999 deaths
Recipients of the Padma Bhushan in literature & education
Indian male dramatists and playwrights
Indian male short story writers
Indian humanists
Indian lyricists
20th-century Indian dramatists and playwrights
20th-century Indian short story writers
Poets from Maharashtra
Dramatists and playwrights from Maharashtra
20th-century Indian poets
20th-century Indian male writers
Presidents of the Akhil Bharatiya Marathi Sahitya Sammelan
Recipients of the Sangeet Natak Akademi Award